John Cummings may refer to:

 John Cummings (Massachusetts banker) (1812–1898), American politician and bank president from Massachusetts
 John Cummings (piper) (1828–post–1913), Irish piper from Athenry
 Jack Cummings (director) (1900–1989), MGM producer
 Jack Cummings (tennis) (1901–1972), Australian player of the 1920s
 Jack Cummings (baseball) (1904–1962), American baseball player
 John Cummings (politician) (1943–2017), English Labour Party Member of Parliament
 John Cummings (footballer) (born 1944), Scottish football player
 Johnny Ramone (John Cummings, 1948–2004), American guitarist of the rock group The Ramones
 John Cummings (musician), Scottish guitarist of the band Mogwai
 John Cummings (baseball) (born 1969), American Major League Baseball pitcher
 John A. Cummings (1838–1887), mayor of Somerville, Massachusetts
 John W. Cummings (1855–1929), American lawyer and politician in Massachusetts

See also
 Jack Cummings (disambiguation)
 John Cummins (disambiguation)
John Commins (disambiguation)
 John Cumming (disambiguation)